The Banff International Research Station (BIRS) for Mathematical Innovation and Discovery was established in 2003. It provides an independent research institute for the mathematical sciences in North America, a counterpart to the Oberwolfach Research Institute for Mathematics in Europe.  The research station, commonly known by its acronym, "BIRS", hosts over 2000 international scientists each year to undertake research collaboration in the mathematical sciences.

Research activities 

The research that takes place at the Banff International Research Station is either in pure mathematics, applied mathematics, or in other areas of science where they intersect with mathematics.

There is a wide range of research publications citing lectures, meetings and reports from BIRS.

Research program 

The Banff International Research Station hosts five types of meetings:

 5-Day Workshops: These make up the core program at BIRS, with up to 42 participants per workshop, 48 weeks per year. Some workshops have only 21 participants, and they share a week at BIRS, running concurrently.
 2-Day Workshops: Weekend workshops, typically consisting of 25 people, and typically from the surrounding areas in Alberta and British Columbia.
 Focused Research Groups:  Up to 8 people from different institutions meet for 1–2 weeks, to work on a specific problem or finish up major projects.
 Research in Teams:  2–4 people from different institutions meet for 1–2 weeks to concentrate on their research.
 Summer Schools and Training Camps: instructional meetings for up to 40 students for up to 14 days.

The core program of 5-day workshops is created two years in advance. Every summer, BIRS issues a Call for Proposals, soliciting applications for workshops from the global scientific community. Each year, it gets more competitive to get a space in the 48 available weeks at BIRS: 79 proposals were received for the 2003 program, and 168 were received for the 2014 program. An extensive peer-review process by international experts culminates in the selection of the scientific program for a given year.

Summer schools and training camps must apply through the same process as 5-day workshops. An example of a summer school is the International Mathematical Olympiad (IMO) training camp, to prepare high school students for competing at the IMO. The other types of meetings are far less competitive, and may be applied for at any time, through the BIRS website.

Meeting facilities 

The Banff International Research Station occupies two buildings on the campus of the Banff Centre, in Banff National Park. One of the buildings, Corbett Hall, is a residence building that provides bedrooms, a common lounge area, a small library, and space for small teams of people to work. The other building, TransCanada PipeLines Pavilion, hosts administrative offices, two lecture rooms, and a series of smaller rooms for break-out sessions and research teams.  As part of the Banff Centre campus, BIRS researchers have full access to all of its amenities and services.

The idea behind this choice of location for a research facility is to create an atmosphere where scientists can remove themselves from day-to-day life, and immerse themselves in their research.

Automated lecture capture 

In 2012, the Banff International Research Station installed a fully automated lecture capture system.  It provides live video streaming and video recording of the lectures that take place in its main lecture room. Video recordings are automatically posted on the BIRS website within a few minutes after a lecture ends. Use of the system is opt-in, decided by the individual lecturers at the time of their lecture, via a touchscreen panel in the lecture room. The automated system at BIRS employs high quality cameras to ensure that mathematics written on chalkboards can be seen clearly. Embedded microphones and audio processing systems capture both the lecturer and questions from the audience.

Recent research videos recorded at BIRS are also available in the iTunes podcast directory.

Funding 
The Banff International Research Station is funded by four governments:

 The federal government of Canada, through the Natural Sciences and Engineering Research Council (NSERC) 
 The provincial government of Alberta, through Alberta Science and Research Authority (ASRA)
 The U.S. National Science Foundation (NSF) 
 Mexico's National Science and Technology Council, (CONACYT)

See also 

 BIRS Founding Director (2001), Nassif Ghoussoub
 BIRS Scientific Director (2001-2003), Robert Moody
 BIRS Scientific Director (2004-2020), Nassif Ghoussoub
 BIRS Scientific Director (2020-2025), Malabika Pramanik
 The Banff Centre
 Banff, Alberta
 Pacific Institute for the Mathematical Sciences
 Mathematical Sciences Research Institute
 Comments from BIRS researchers

References 

Research stations
Research institutes in Canada
International research institutes for mathematics
Buildings and structures in Banff, Alberta
Research institutes established in 2003
2003 establishments in Alberta